The 2006 Cup of Russia was the fifth event of six in the 2006–07 ISU Grand Prix of Figure Skating, a senior-level international invitational competition series. It was held at the Luzhniki Small Sports Arena in Moscow on November 23–26. Medals were awarded in the disciplines of men's singles, ladies' singles, pair skating, and ice dancing. Skaters earned points toward qualifying for the 2006–07 Grand Prix Final.

Results

Men

Ladies

Pairs
Canadian pair team Anabelle Langlois / Cody Hay were forced to withdraw after the airline lost Langlois's skates.

Ice dancing

External links
 2006 Competition
 2006 Cup of Russia - Official Site

Cup Of Russia, 2006
Cup of Russia
Rostelecom Cup